Australian singer Tones and I has released one studio album, one extended play, and thirteen singles.

Albums

Extended plays

Singles

Other charted songs

Notes

References

Discographies of Australian artists
Pop music discographies